Thomas Garas (born 18 May 1998) is a Greek professional footballer who plays as a centre-back for Super League 2 club Apollon Larissa.

References

1998 births
Living people
Greek footballers
Super League Greece 2 players
Gamma Ethniki players
Platanias F.C. players
Association football defenders
Footballers from Thessaloniki
21st-century Greek people